Riihimäki Prison (Finnish: Riihimäen vankila) is the main correctional facility in southern Finland, located in Riihimäki. It is a closed prison, with capacity for 223 inmates.  Along with Turku, Riihimäki is one of two prisons in Finland with the highest A+ security rating. It houses prisoners mainly from southern Finland, as well as comprising three national specialist units, including one for sexual offenders.

References

External links

Prisons in Finland
Riihimäki
Buildings and structures in Kanta-Häme